"Commendatori" is the seventeenth episode of the HBO original series The Sopranos and the fourth of the show's second season. It was written by David Chase and directed by Tim Van Patten, and originally aired on February 6, 2000.

Starring
 James Gandolfini as Tony Soprano
 Lorraine Bracco as Dr. Jennifer Melfi *
 Edie Falco as Carmela Soprano
 Michael Imperioli as Christopher Moltisanti
 Dominic Chianese as Corrado Soprano, Jr.
 Vincent Pastore as Pussy Bonpensiero
 Steven Van Zandt as Silvio Dante
 Tony Sirico as Paulie Gualtieri
 Robert Iler as Anthony Soprano, Jr. *
 Jamie-Lynn Sigler as Meadow Soprano
 Drea de Matteo as Adriana La Cerva *
 David Proval as Richie Aprile *
 Aida Turturro as Janice Soprano
 Nancy Marchand as Livia Soprano*

* = credit only

Guest starring

Synopsis
Tony goes to Naples with Paulie and Christopher to negotiate the smuggling of stolen luxury cars to Italy with a local Camorra family distantly related to the Sopranos. His contact there is Furio Giunta, a local mobster who speaks English. Tony learns that Don Vittorio, boss of the Naples family, is senile. His son-in-law, Mauro Zucca, had been in charge but is now serving life in prison. It is hard for Tony to accept that Annalisa—Vittorio's daughter and Mauro's wife—is the de facto head of the family.

Tony negotiates with Annalisa, naming his price for the cars, asking that Furio be sent to work for him in the United States, and asking that others be sent in the future as he requires. Annalisa scoffs at his proposition. Later, Annalisa comes on to him but he tells her he wishes to keep their relationship professional. Tony then lowers his price for the cars in exchange for Furio and any subsequent men; she agrees. Meanwhile, Paulie tries to rediscover his roots only to uncover a distaste for Italy, while Christopher is high on heroin almost all the time.

Carmela is resentful that Tony has not taken her to Italy.  She has lunch with Rosalie Aprile and Angie Bonpensiero, where Angie shares how unhappy she is that Pussy has returned. He is indifferent to her even though she is awaiting the result of a biopsy. She says she has thought of suicide and that she intends to divorce him. Carmela later visits her and urges her not to break the sacrament of marriage.

While with his FBI handler, Skip Lipari, Pussy runs into Jimmy Bones, a Soprano associate. They concoct a cover story, but Pussy is afraid that Jimmy does not believe it. He goes to Jimmy's home and beats him to death with a ball-peen hammer. Pussy then goes home with a bouquet for Angie. When she told him earlier that her tumor was benign, he hardly listened. Now he gives her the flowers, but after a short pause, she beats him with them.

Tony returns home. Carmela is upstairs, doing housework. He calls her. After a short pause, she goes to greet him.

First appearances
 Furio Giunta: a made man from the Naples Mafia headed by Don Vittorio and Annalisa Zucca. He is sent to America after a successful trade between Tony and Annalisa.
 This also marks the first recast appearances of Angie Bonpensiero (Pussy's wife) and Gabriella Dante (Silvio's wife). Previously, both of these characters (although only implied as their wives) appeared very briefly in the season one episodes "The Legend of Tennessee Moltisanti" and "Nobody Knows Anything, played by different actresses.

Deceased
 Jimmy Bones: an Elvis impersonator and Mafia associate, who Big Pussy beat to death with a ball-peen hammer after running into him when talking with his FBI handler.

Title reference
The episode's title is a plural of the Italian language word commendatore, which is an honorable title in Italian society. Tony and his crew are given this greeting in Italy, which Paulie hears and then tries to use throughout the episode.

Cultural references
Paulie mentions Fredo as they try to play The Godfather Part II DVD. He also mentions Paramount Pictures.
A Neapolitan passer-by complains to Paulie that NATO cut their cable car. This refers to the Cavalese cable car disaster (1998).
Junior—who is at the orthopaedic office for his hip—tells Tony that wiping himself hurts like "The Pit and the Pendulum" by Edgar Allan Poe.

Connections to past episodes
 Junior meets with Tony at the doctor's office for an X-ray on his hip after slipping in the shower in "Do Not Resuscitate".

Production
 Series creator and head writer David Chase makes a cameo appearance in the episode as an Italian man, sitting at a cafe with other men. When Paulie says "commendatori" to the table, Chase glances at him indifferently and then turns away.
 Vittorio Duse, who played Zi Vittorio, also played Don Tommasino in the 1990 film The Godfather Part III.

Music
 The song "Con te partirò" by Andrea Bocelli is played three times throughout the episode.
 When Tony is driven to Annalisa Zucca's villa the Napolitano song "Core 'ngrato" is played (without the vocals).
 Before the dinner in Italy, a portion of the arrangement of the song "Andalucia" by Pink Martini plays.
 The song "Marco Polo" by Jovanotti is briefly played when Christopher is taking heroin for the first time.
 The song "Certamente" by the Italian rock band Madreblu is played when Christopher is taking drugs the second time.
 The song played over the end credits is "Piove" by Jovanotti.

Filming locations 
Listed in order of first appearance:

 Lodi, New Jersey
 Naples, Italy
 Monte di Procida, Italy
 Bacoli, Italy
 Newark International Airport
 Route 21 in Belleville, New Jersey

References

External links
"Commendatori"  at HBO

The Sopranos (season 2) episodes
2000 American television episodes
Television episodes set in Italy
Works about the Camorra
Television episodes written by David Chase
Television episodes directed by Tim Van Patten

fr:Retour aux sources (Les Sopranos)